Sybil Ursula Ward (June 24, 1894 – March 31, 1977) was one of the first female lawyers in Delaware.

Ward was born on June 24, 1894 in Wilmington, Delaware. She was born into a family of lawyers, as her father Herbert H. Ward was an attorney. She had attended the Wheaton College in Massachusetts and completed her legal education at the University of Pennsylvania Law School. In 1923, she and Evangelyn Barsky were the first women admitted to practice law in Delaware. Ward then practiced with her father at the law firm Ward & Gray. She would go on to become the first female to serve on the Wilmington City Council.

She died on March 31, 1977 in Wilmington.

See also 

 List of first women lawyers and judges in Delaware

References 

Delaware lawyers
University of Pennsylvania Law School alumni
Wheaton College (Massachusetts) alumni
1894 births
1977 deaths
People from Wilmington, Delaware
Delaware city council members
Women city councillors in Delaware
20th-century American lawyers
20th-century American politicians
20th-century American women politicians
20th-century American women lawyers